John Henry Stump (June 4, 1880 – May 15, 1949) was an American cigar maker, labor advocate, and Socialist politician who served as Mayor of Reading, Pennsylvania.

Biography
John Henry Stump was born June 4, 1880 in Reading, Pennsylvania. He ended his education at the age of thirteen, as his father was in ill health and he needed to provide for the family. He was briefly apprenticed to a cigar maker, and worked in that industry throughout his life.

Stump joined the Socialist Party's local organization in 1902, and in 1918 became the business manager of the Labor Advocate, a weekly newspaper published by the Socialist Party of Berks County. He was the Socialist candidate for Reading City Council in 1911 and Mayor in 1919 and 1923. In 1927, Stump was elected mayor, with James H. Maurer and another socialist serving alongside him as city councilmen. This was significant, as Reading became one of the few cities with a majority socialist government. Stump was defeated in his reelection, but regained his office in 1935 and again in 1943.

Split with Socialist Party
Stump left the Socialist Party of America following the Old Guard faction's split and helped form the Social Democratic Federation in 1936. He served as vice-chair of the SDF along with John Shenton of Connecticut.

At the SDF's founding convention in 1937, Stump spoke critically of his former party, stating:

We came here because we could no longer square our Socialist conscience with remaining in the party which has fallen into the hands of disruptors, of people who do not believe in the idea and ideals of democratic Socialism. I am confident that at this convention we will build an organization that will truly represent these ideas.

See also
List of elected socialist mayors in the United States
Mayor of Reading, Pennsylvania

References

External links
 J. Henry Stump: Reading's Most Memorable Mayor. By Edwin B. Yeich.  Published by The Historical Society of Berks County. Article originally appeared in the Summer 1958 issue of the Historical Review of Berks County.
 In Milwaukee. Time Magazine. Monday, Jan. 23, 1928

Further reading 

 Hendrickson, Jr. Kenneth E. The Socialist Administration in Reading, Pennsylvania, Part I, 1927-1931. Pennsylvania History. October, 1972. Link to article
 Hendrickson, Jr. Kenneth E. Triumph and Disaster:  The Reading Socialists in Power and Decline, Part II, 1932-1939. Pennsylvania History. October, 1973. Link to article

1880 births
1949 deaths
Mayors of Reading, Pennsylvania
Socialist Party of America politicians from Pennsylvania
20th-century American politicians
Members of the Social Democratic Federation (United States)